Chatham Township is located in Sangamon County, Illinois. As of the 2010 census, its population was 6,978 and it contained 2,963 housing units.  Chatham Township changed its name from Campbell Township on September 2, 1863.

Geography

Demographics

References

External links
City-data.com
Illinois State Archives

Townships in Sangamon County, Illinois
Springfield metropolitan area, Illinois
Townships in Illinois